Ellie Stone is a British and Scottish track cyclist.

Cycling career
Stone became a double British champion when winning the Time Trial and Keirin events at the 2022 British National Track Championships. Stone also competed alongside Aileen McGlynn as her pilot in the 2022 Commonwealth Games claiming two medals.

Major results
2022 Commonwealth Games
  Women’s B Tandem Sprint (Piloting Aileen McGlynn)
  Women’s Tandem B 1000m time trial (Piloting Aileen McGlynn)

2022 British National Track Championships
 1st  Time Trial
 1st  Kierin

References

Living people
British female cyclists
British track cyclists
Scottish track cyclists
Scottish female cyclists
Year of birth missing (living people)